Mirror is a mini-album by American rock band The Rapture, released in 1999 through Gravity Records.

Track listing

References 

The Rapture (band) albums
1999 debut albums